Arcimoto is an electric vehicle company headquartered in Eugene, Oregon that manufactures and sells the Fun Utility Vehicle, or FUV, a tandem two-seat, three-wheeled electric vehicle. They also sell van-variations on the design "Rapid Responder" for emergency services, and "Deliverator" for last-mile deliveries.

Company overview

History
On September 23, 2009, Arcimoto debuted the Pulse, with an estimated $20,000 price, taking pre-orders for $500. The Pulse is now considered a Generation 3 prototype by the company.

Arcimoto revealed their fifth prototype, and the first SRK, on April 23, 2011. According to Frohnmayer, actor Nathan Fillion drove their vehicle and came out saying it was like driving a shark, which is where the name SRK came from. This model added extra power (89 hp) and four body designs on a common chassis. According to Frohnmayer, Generation 6 SRK, revealed in April 2012, was to be the pilot with 14 vehicles produced, 10 of which already had committed purchasers, then the pilot run had been increased to 40 units, sold for $41,000 each. Some time later, Generation 7 was expected to be the mass production model in late 2012 but the company determined it was too large and heavy to create a viable market solution and opted to develop an eighth prototype generation that featured handlebars instead of a steering wheel. 

In 2017, Arcimoto filed an IPO and was listed on NASDAQ as FUV and soon after began delivering its first production vehicle named the FUV.

In June 2020, Arcimoto started working with Sandy Munro to streamline the design and manufacture. 

In mid-January 2023, Arcimoto, running low on cash, idled its factory and floated the possibility of bankruptcy.

Arcimoto has designed and built eight generations of three-wheeled electric vehicle prototypes.

Products
Arcimoto produces multiple products based on the same vehicle platform. The vehicles have  of range from the battery electric powertrain. The platform is divided into the FUV for personal use, the Rapid Responder for emergency services, and the Deliverator for last-mile and local delivery. Future variations of the platform have been announced, such as the Cameo and flatbed truck variants; public information is still limited.

Three-Wheeled Platform

Technical specifications
Claimed Performance

Weight & Measures

Features:

The company has stated that it hopes to someday produce vehicles with cooled seats.

Additional product specs
The CEO of Arcimoto says that the vehicles use off-the-shelf motor controllers, battery cells, and switched reluctance motors, as well as a two-stage reduction gearbox developed and built in house. He also stated that the vehicles contain two single speed parallel gear trains with a 7:1 ratio. The Arcimoto website, as of 2021 August 14, contains none of this technical information.

Manufacturing/AMP
The Arcimoto Manufacturing Plant is Arcimoto’s original production facility. The company began leasing the building October 1, 2017. Arcimoto held a grand opening ceremony on November 29, 2017 where Arcimoto's President reflected on the progress made over eight generations of their vehicle platform. Upon building out the interior with equipment capable of producing up to 5,000 units per year, they began production on September 19, 2019.

As the company refines their manufacturing processes and the product platform, the AMP will act as a template for future AMPs. Subsequent AMPs will support 50,000 to 100,000 units per year. Except for an east coast AMP in the US, new AMPs will be built as joint ventures. The company plans to have local production capacity in Europe, Southeast Asia, and another, undetermined location.

Second manufacturing facility
In 2021, Arcimoto purchased a manufacturing facility, unofficially dubbed the RAMP, about a city block away from AMP 1. It was previously owned by Pacific Metal Fab, a metal fabrication business, resulting in minimal remodel work needing to be completed. RAMP is 185,000 square feet or roughly five times larger than AMP 1. Once fully ramped, the company expects to produce 25,000 vehicles in this facility. The first vehicles off the line are due by the end of 2021.

Batteries
As of 2021, Arcimoto is utilizing cells made by the manufacturer Farasis Energy, a Chinese-based battery cell supplier. Farasis will add additional production capacity in the United States and Europe. This will enable lower costs for Arcimoto, reduced lead time, and decrease the likelihood of logistical delays concerning the physical distance and political climate between the US and China. As of May 2020 their supplier was conducting site selection in the US.

The FUV platform uses pouch cells with a Lithium-Nickel Manganese Cobalt (NMC) battery chemistry of about 30 Ah each from Farasis Energy, which are the same as Zero Motorcycle’s cells or the cells in the Polaris / Brammo Empulse. The cells combine to a total of 19.2 kWh in the FUV battery in a 28s 6p configuration.  In conventional EV battery notation, "6p" means that cells are combined in groups of 6 cells in parallel (for 180 Ah of total capacity), and "28s" means that 28 of those groups are connected in series. A smaller battery pack of 12 kWh has a 28s 4p configuration of the same cells, for the same pack voltage but only two-thirds of the capacity. Arcimoto developed their own interconnect system for the batteries using a "novel way of crimping bus bars." The battery is capable of accepting level 2 charging; however, the company plans on making their fleet vehicles handle higher charging rates.

Autonomous driving
Instead of developing autonomous driving itself, Arcimoto has implemented the foundation for third-party autonomous hardware and software that will integrate into the vehicle platform. For example, the steering is enabled for “drive by wire” so that software can control the direction of the wheels without the need for additional hardware.

Leading up to level 5 autonomous driving, the company anticipates a gradual increase of ADAS features.

Software
Arcimoto vehicles will have custom software in the vehicle, along with a mobile application.

Arcimotos will be subject to over-the-air updates. Updates can affect all components, including the display and the handling characteristics.

In addition to controlling driving dynamics, the mobile application will control how the vehicle behaves. For example, golf courses may construct geofences which will limit the top speed of an FUV while the passengers are golfing.

The application will also enable Arcimoto owners to rent their vehicle to others.

FUV
The company's first vehicle, the Fun Utility Vehicle, or FUV, is a tandem two-seat three wheeled electric motorcycle with an EPA-rated range of 102 city miles per charge The vehicle will have a fuel economy of 173.7 MPGe at city driving speeds. The company officially launched production and delivery of the retail Fun Utility Vehicle on September 19, 2019.

Rapid Responder
The Rapid Responder variant is built for emergency services and security professionals. Due to its smaller footprint compared to traditional emergency vehicles, the Rapid Responder can arrive at the scene of an incident more quickly and easily. The core of the Rapid Responder is an FUV with a roof rack available to store equipment and is outfitted with emergency flashing lights, including forward facing lights for increased visibility. The Rapid Responder also comes with a siren and 360-degree scene lights situated around the vehicle.

Arcimoto is conducting pilot programs of the Rapid Responder with the City of Eugene, the Eugene Springfield Fire Department, and the city of Eastvale, California.

Deliverator
The Deliverator is built for businesses who offer local and last-mile delivery to their customers. This variant comes with only one seat. The back seat is replaced by an extra-large cargo area that is accessible by a door on the right side (when seated in the vehicle). With a carrying capacity of over 350 pounds and over 15+ cubic feet of storage, the Deliverator enables deliveries of parcels.

Arcimoto is conducting pilot programs with companies and organizations around the US. The production version of the Deliverator will be ready by the end of 2020. Production is expected to ramp up to volume production during 2021.

Roadster
This FUV variant features no roof or roll cage, similar to a three-wheeled motorcycle. According to the company, removing the roof reduces the vehicle's weight by about 100 pounds. The seats are being developed by Corbin-Pacific while the windshield is being developed by National Cycle. Corbin-Pacific and National Cycle also manufacture the seats, windshield and roof for the FUV, Rapid Responder, and Deliverator. Pricing starts at $23,900 and will begin production in Q2 2021. Finalized specs have not been announced for the Roadster.

Future versions

Cameo
The Cameo is the fourth variant of the Arcimoto platform that is specifically designed for filming applications. The passenger seat and storage compartment is replaced with a rear-facing seat. This configuration provides free range of motion for a cameraperson to film.

Flatbed pickup truck
The Cameo variant lays the groundwork for the fifth variant, a flatbed pickup serving the general utility market.

Executives
 Mark Frohnmayer, Founder, President: Mark grew up in Eugene, Oregon before attending the University of California, Berkeley. He graduated in 1996 with degrees in electrical engineering and computer science.  Has past experience is in software development with Dynamix and his own company GarageGames. Arcimoto's formation was funded with the Frohnmayer's share of the sale of GarageGames to IAC.

See also
 List of companies based in Oregon
 List of motorized trikes

References

External links

Companies based in Eugene, Oregon
Electric vehicle manufacturers of the United States
Motorcycle manufacturers of the United States
Privately held companies based in Oregon
Three-wheeled motor vehicles
Companies listed on the Nasdaq